Con Lehane may refer to:

Con Lehane (socialist) (1877–1919), socialist active in the Irish Socialist Republican Party, the Social Democratic Federation, and the Socialist Party of Great Britain
Con Lehane (Irish republican) (1911–1983), member of the IRA Army Council and member of Dáil Éireann